The Bruces sketch is a comedy sketch that originally appeared in a 1970 episode of the television show Monty Python's Flying Circus, episode 22, "How to Recognise Different Parts of the Body", and was subsequently performed on audio recordings and live on many occasions by the Monty Python team.

In reference to the sketch, Iron Maiden singer Bruce Dickinson used the stage name "Bruce Bruce" while a member of the British hard rock band Samson.

Description

The sketch involves four stereotypical "ocker" Australians of the period, who are all wearing khakis and cork hats. All are named Bruce, hence being known as the Bruces.

The skit begins with three Bruces sitting at a table, as someone sings Waltzing Matilda in the background. The boss Bruce arrives with a new staff member, a "pommie" (person from England) named Michael Baldwin (played by Terry Jones) of what turns out to be a meeting of the Philosophy Department of the fictitious University of Woolloomooloo (see below). Because Baldwin's first name is different from that of everyone else, he is asked if he minds being called "Bruce" to avoid confusion.

The department appears to be situated in nothing more than a simple wooden building somewhere near Uluru/Ayers Rock (which is visible in the distance behind them) in Australia's Northern Territory.

The Bruces all have a common fondness for lager beer and a dislike of "poofters" (a derogatory Australian and English slang word for a homosexual). John Cleese's character (who in a later sketch is called Bruce Beer) recites the seven faculty rules at the University of Woolloomooloo:

 No poofters.
 No member of the faculty is to maltreat the "Abos" in any way whatsoever—if there's anyone watching.
 No poofters.
 I don't want to catch anyone not drinking in their room after lights out.
 No poofters.
 There is no rule six.
 No poofters.

The meeting contains various prayers recited by the Bruces, including, "Oh Lord, we beseech thee. Amen.", "Australia, Australia, Australia, Australia, we love you. Amen.", and "This here's the wattle, the emblem of our land. You can stick it in a bottle or you can hold it in your hand. Amen."

Versions
The sketch appeared on the Matching Tie and Handkerchief album and in many of the team's stage shows, where it would be capped with a performance of "Bruces' Philosophers Song". Free cans of Fosters beer were tossed to the audience with the addition of a joke about American beer given at Monty Python Live at the Hollywood Bowl.

The song does not feature in the original television version, which instead ends with the first Bruce saying "Sidney Nolan! What's that?" pointing to the ear of fourth Bruce returning to that episode's running joke, "how to recognise different parts of the body", with the voice over saying, "Number nine. The ear." (the TV sketch began with "Number eight. The kneecap." and a closeup of the First Bruce's knee).

A slightly different version of the sketch is recorded on Monty Python Live at Drury Lane. The identity of "Bruce" is Lauchlan Chipman, Professor of Philosophy and friend of Michael Palin. Chipman was the founding Chairman of the Philosophy Department at the University of Wollongong.

Development
Eric Idle co-wrote the sketch with Cleese and said he based it on his Australian friends from the 1960s "who always seemed to be called Bruce". Australian film director Bruce Beresford was friends with Idle while Idle was idling in Notting Hill.

The fictional University of Woolamaloo is based on either a misspelling of, or a name derived from, the Sydney suburb of Woolloomooloo, and is how the suburb is actually pronounced with an Australian accent.

References

Australia in fiction
Fictional Australian people
Cultural depictions of Australian people
Monty Python sketches
Homophobia in fiction